Sprakensehl is a municipality in the district of Gifhorn, in Lower Saxony, Germany. Sprakensehl includes the villages of Behren, Blickwedel, Bokel, Hagen, Masel, Sprakensehl and Zittel.

References

Gifhorn (district)